Eséka is a small town in central Cameroon.

Transport 
The city of Eséka lies on the main Camrail railway, where the line enters more rugged terrain from the coastal plains.

On 22 October 2016, a passenger train derailed close to the town.  The train, traveling from the capital Yaoundé to the economic hub Douala was crammed with people due to road traffic disruption between the two cities and came off the tracks just before reaching Eséka. At least 60 people were killed with many hundreds injured.

See also 
 Communes of Cameroon
 Railway stations in Cameroon
 Transport in Cameroon

References

External links 

 Site de la primature – Élections municipales 2002 
 Contrôle de gestion et performance des services publics communaux des villes camerounaises- Thèse de Donation Avele, Université Montesquieu Bordeaux IV 
 Charles Nanga, La réforme de l’administration territoriale au Cameroun à la lumière de la loi constitutionnelle n° 96/06 du 18 janvier 1996, Mémoire ENA. 

Populated places in Centre Region (Cameroon)